Mike Schloesser (born 15 january 1994 in Heerlen, Netherlands) is a compound archer from Netherlands. He has won minet medals at the World Youth Archery Championships, competed in the Archery World Cup and in the 2013 World Archery Championships he qualified 5th in the same event. He also competed in the men's team compound and mixed team compound event for Netherlands.

He won the gold medal in the men's individual compound event at the 2019 European Games held in Minsk, Belarus. Schloesser and Sanne de Laat also won the silver medal in the mixed team compound event.

In 2021, he won the silver medal in the men's individual compound event at the World Archery Championships held in Yankton, United States.

In February 2022, he won the gold medal in both the men's compound and men's team compound events at the 2022 European Indoor Archery Championships held in Laško, Slovenia. In March 2022, he won also the men's compound event at the Dutch National Indoor Archery Championships. In April 2022, he won the gold medal in the men's compound event at the Antalya, Turkey event in the 2022 Archery World Cup.

He won the gold medal in the men's individual compound event at the 2022 European Archery Championships held in Munich, Germany. He also won the silver medal in the men's team compound event.

References

External links

 

1994 births
Living people
Dutch male archers
Sportspeople from Heerlen
World Archery Championships medalists
Archers at the 2019 European Games
European Games medalists in archery
European Games gold medalists for the Netherlands
European Games silver medalists for the Netherlands
Competitors at the 2022 World Games
World Games silver medalists
World Games medalists in archery
21st-century Dutch people